Witness to the Mob is a made-for-TV film which premiered on Sunday, May 10, and concluded on Monday, May 11, 1998.

Plot
Based on a true story, the film follows the rise of Sammy Gravano in ranks in the Gambino crime family, one of the "Five Families" of the New York Cosa Nostra that dominates organized crime activities in New York City, his turning to government witness in the legal trials of John Gotti and his life in federal Witness Protection Program.

Cast
 Nicholas Turturro as Sammy Gravano
 Tom Sizemore as John Gotti
 Debi Mazar as Deborah Gravano
 Abe Vigoda as Paul Castellano
 Philip Baker Hall as Salvatore "Toddo" Aurello
 Frank Vincent as Frank DeCicco
 Lenny Venito as Sal DiMaggio
Johnny Williams as Angelo Ruggiero
 Frankie Valli as Frank LoCascio
 Michael Imperioli as Louie Milito
 Vincent Pastore as Michael DeBatt
 Peter McRobbie as George Pape (based on Gerard Pappa)
 Nicholas Kepros as Vincent "The Chin" (Vincent Gigante)
Michael Ryan Segal as Nicky Cowboy (Nicholas Mormando)
 Tony Sirico as Tommy Gambino (Thomas Gambino)
 Richard Bright as Joseph Paruta
Richard E.Council as Louie DiBono (Louis DiBono)
Peter Appel as Eddie Garofal (Edward Garofalo)
Gerard Cordero as Wiseguy #1
Tony Kruk as Di Bernardo (Robert DiBernardo)
Stephen Payne as Bosko Radonjich
 Leonardo Cimino as Neil Dellacroce
 Arthur Nascarella as Bruce Mouw
 Gaetano LoGiudice as Gotti Bodyguard
 Kirk Acevedo as Nicholas Scibetta
 Joseph Siravo as Gene Gotti
 Kathrine Narducci as Linda Milito

Production
The film was based on court records, FBI transcripts and news reports (rather than on the 1997 book Underboss written by Peter Maas).

Vincent Pastore, Tony Sirico, and Frank Vincent had all previously appeared in Gotti (1996 film), which covered the same events, each playing a different character than he played in this film.

References

External links 
 

1998 films
1998 crime films
1990s biographical films
American television films
American crime films
American biographical films
Biographical films about gangsters
Cultural depictions of John Gotti
Cultural depictions of Paul Castellano
Cultural depictions of Vincent Gigante
Films about the American Mafia
Films directed by Thaddeus O'Sullivan
Gambino crime family
1990s American films